= Speed limits in Serbia =

130 km/h (81 mph) on motorways (since June 1st, 2018)

Four general speed limits apply on roads in Serbia:

- 50 km/h (31 mph) within inhabited places.
- 80 km/h (50 mph) outside inhabited places.
- 100 km/h (62 mph) on expressways (Put rezervisan za saobraćaj motornih vozila).
- 130 km/h (81 mph) on motorways (Autoput).

The limits shown above apply only if there are no other signs present, as the signs may prescribe a lower or a higher speed limit (limits of 80 km/h or higher can also be found within inhabited places).

Speed limit by vehicle type:

- 80 km/h (50 mph) for buses, buses towing trailers and goods vehicles up to 7.5 tonnes, except on highways/motorways where speed is limited to 100 km/h (62 mph).
- 80 km/h (50 mph) for vehicles towing caravans or trailers.
- 70 km/h (43 mph) for buses transporting children, goods vehicles over 7.5 tonnes and goods vehicles with joined vehicle, except on highway where speed is limited to 90 km/h (56 mph).
